Great Aspirations is the debut record by English duo TC&I (bassist Colin Moulding and drummer Terry Chambers, both formerly of the band XTC). The EP was released on 7 October 2017. The record marked the first recordings made by Chambers since 1984 when, after leaving XTC, he relocated to Australia and joined the band Dragon, touring with them from 1983 to 1984 and recording an album. With the exception of guest appearances as a session vocalist, bass player, and collaborator on several albums, the EP also marked the return to recording by Moulding, his first new recordings since XTC's disbandment in 2006.

Release
Dave Franklin of the Swindon Advertiser reviewed the EP as "something tasteful, deftly wrought, restrained and wonderfully English, West Country…. Swindonian even, if you are close enough to get the references." 

XTC co-founder Andy Partridge praised "Scatter Me" and "Kenny" as his favourite cuts on the record, and wished "Colin (and Terry) all the best in the world."

Promotion
TC&I played six sold-out shows at Swindon Arts Centre in October and November 2018, their first live performances together in 35 years. A subsequent live recording of the sixth and last show, Naked Flames, was released on 9 August 2019. It was the only night in which the recording was not plagued by technical issues. Some songs they performed were omitted from the album due to Moulding's dissatisfaction with the band's playing.

Dissolution
In January 2019, a statement released through social media announced that TC&I had disbanded, and that Moulding had once again put his music career on hold in order to spend more time with his family. Moulding stated that he was not interested in pursuing a tour, as the performances were simply to satisfy "a curiosity", but said that Chambers may continue playing gigs.

Track listing
All songs written by Colin Moulding.

"Scatter Me" – 4:32
"Greatness (The Aspiration Song) – 3:53
"Kenny" – 4:33
"Comrades of Pop" – 2:23

Personnel
TC&I
Terry Chambers – drums, percussion, backing vocals
Colin Moulding – guitars, basses, keyboards, lead vocals

Additional musicians
Alan Bateman – saxophone and trumpet on "Kenny" and "Scatter Me"
Susannah Bevington – soprano voice on "Scatter Me"
Mikey Rowe – Farfisa organ and ornate tinkling on "Scatter Me"

Technical
TC&I – producers, engineers, design concept
Stuart Rowe – mixing
John Bucket – engineer
Pete Hewington – assistant engineer
Jason Mitchell – mastering
Geoff Winn – photography
Andrew Swainson – design

References

External links
 
  on Chalkhills

2017 debut EPs
XTC
Terry Chambers albums
Colin Moulding albums
PledgeMusic albums